Fernando Amado (Montevideo, 11 September 1982) is a Uruguayan political scientist, writer and politician.

Biography
Son Esther Fernández and former Commander in Chief of the Army Lt. Gral. Fernán Amado.

He studied political science at the  University of the Republic and graduated with a bachelor's degree.
As a child, he closely followed the Julio María Sanguinetti and Hugo Batalla campaigns in the 1994 elections.

Books 
2007, Desconfianza infinita.  
2008, En penumbras. 
2009, El peso de la cruz.
2010, Óscar Magurno. 
2011, La masonería uruguaya. 
2012, Mandato de sangre. 
2013, Bajo sospecha. 
2015, El club de los millones.
2019, La máscara de la diversidad. 
2020, La masonería Uruguaya.

References

External links

1932 births
Living people
Uruguayan political scientists
Uruguayan writers
Spanish-language writers
Members of the Chamber of Representatives of Uruguay
Colorado Party (Uruguay) politicians
Broad Front (Uruguay) politicians
People from Montevideo
University of the Republic (Uruguay) alumni